William Beidelman was an American politician from the Lehigh Valley. He was a veteran of the Union Army that saw combat at the Battle of Gettysburg. After the war, he served in various Northampton County offices before being elected as a Democrat to the Pennsylvania State Senate. He also served as the second mayor of the city of Easton, Pennsylvania.

Early life

Beidelman was born in Lower Saucon Township on January 17, 1840, to Daniel Beidelman and Anna Née Margaret and had a brother, Robert C. Beidelman. However, shortly after, his family would move to Williams Township where he was raised. He attended public school and attended the New York Conference Seminary before going on to study at Troy University and Rensselaer Polytechnic Institute. He received a law degree from the Albany Law School.

Career

Union Army

After graduating, Beidelman volunteered for the Union Army on April 18, 1861, and saw nine months of service in the 153rd Pennsylvania Volunteers Infantry as a Second Lieutenant. He saw combat at the Battle of Aldie, the Mud March, Battle of Chancellorsville, Battle of Gettysburg and the Battle of Funkstown before he was mustered out of service on July 24, 1863.

Northampton County

After leaving the army, Beidelman served in various positions in the Northampton County government as a Democrat. Including from 1865 to 1867 when he was Deputy Sheriff of Northampton County. In 1868 he was admitted to the Northampton Bar association as an attorney as well as briefly being editor of the Northampton Democrat. He was elected District Attorney of Northampton County in 1871 and served until 1874.

Pennsylvania State Senate

Beidelman was elected to the Pennsylvania State Senate for the 18th District in 1878 and served in the office from 1879 to 1882, he did not stand for re-election.

Mayor of Easton

Beidelman became the Solicitor of Easton while it was still a borough in 1885 until it was elevated to a city in 1887. After which he successfully ran a campaign to become the city's second mayor and first Democrat mayor in 1889 and started his term in 1890. He did not seek re-election in 1893 and his term expired in 1894.

Personal life

Beidelman married Mary née Slator shortly out of the army and remained married to her until his death. The couple had no issue. Beidelman was a member of the Jacksonian Democratic Association, a Freemason, achieving the rank of Knights Templar and a member of the Grand Army of the Republic. In 1898 he published a book titled "The Story of the Pennsylvania Germans" exploring the origin,  history, and dialect of the Pennsylvania Dutch. In gathering research for the book he personally made several trips to Germany. He also maintained a column in The Express-Times titled "Antiquary" where he published historical stories from Northampton county. He died in 1903 after a 4-day battle with illness. Flags across Easton where lowered to half mast in remembrance, but Beidelman insisted that no special formal action be taken after his passing. His tombstone inscription reads "HE FOUGHT FOR HIS COUNTRY AT GETTYSBURG"

References

Mayors of Easton, Pennsylvania
Pennsylvania Democrats
Troy University alumni
Rensselaer Polytechnic Institute alumni
Albany Law School alumni
1840 births
1903 deaths